The Education Conservancy  is an American educational non-profit organization headed by director Lloyd Thacker.  It describes its goal as being "committed to improving college admission processes for students, colleges and high schools."

Criticism of college rankings
In May 2007,  a movement criticizing the practice of college rankings was initiated by Thacker. It follows previous movements in the U.S. and Canada (by schools in the 1990s such as Reed College, Stanford University, and Alma College, as well as a number of universities in Canada in 2006) that have criticized the practice of college rankings.

The Presidents Letter (dated May 10, 2007), which was developed by Thacker, was sent to college and university presidents in the United States in May 2007. The letter does not ask for a full boycott but rather states: 

Instead, it asks presidents not to participate in the "reputational survey" portion of the overall survey (this section accounts for 25% of the total rank and asks college presidents to give their subjective opinion of other colleges). The letter also asks presidents not to use the rankings as a form of publicity: 

Twelve college and university presidents originally signed the letter in early May. The letter currently has 61 signatures, though others may be added at a later date.

Debate
A debate concerning the decision of the Annapolis Group to offer an alternative set of data as part of the movement challenging commercial college rankings  was published as a podcast in the June 25, 2007, issue of Inside Higher Ed. The debate was between Thacker and U.S. News editor Brian Kelly. The debate was moderated by Inside Higher Ed reporter Scott Jaschik.

See also
 List of colleges and universities which have signed the Presidents Letter

References

External links
Official Website
The Rankings Rebel - BusinessWeek
It Took Awhile, But Some Presidents Are Now Listening to Pleas for Admissions Reforms - Chronicle of Higher Education
Another way in:Ex-counselor working toward less-stressful college admissions - Boston Globe
Searchable Database of Every U.S. College

Educational organizations based in the United States